Terror! Robespierre and the French Revolution is a 2009 documentary broadcast on BBC Two in July 2009.

Synopsis

In 1794, French revolutionary Maximilien Robespierre produced the world's first defense of "state terror" – claiming that the road to virtue lay through political violence. This film combines drama, archive and documentary interviews to examine Robespierre's year in charge of the Committee of Public Safety – the powerful state machine at the heart of Revolutionary France. Contesting Robespierre's legacy are Slavoj Žižek, who argues that terror in the cause of virtue is justifiable, and Simon Schama, who believes the road from Robespierre ran straight to the gulag and the 20th-century concentration camp. The drama, based on original sources, follows the life-and-death politics of the committee during "Year Two" of the new Republic. It was a year which gave birth to key features of the modern age: the thought crime; the belief that calculated acts of violence can perfect humanity; the notion that the interests of "mankind" can be placed above those of "man"; the use of policemen to enforce morals; and the use of denunciation as a political tool.

Cast
Stephen Hogan as Maximilien Robespierre
Ed Stoppard as Herault de Seychelles
George Maguire as Louis Antoine de Saint-Just
Brian Pettifer as Georges Couthon
Jonny Phillips as Lazare Carnot
Martin Hancock as Jean-Marie Collot d'Herbois

External links
 Official Page at BBC Two
 A Review in The Independent
 

2009 television specials
BBC television documentaries
Documentary films about Maximilien Robespierre
2009 films
2000s British films